Four Japanese destroyers have been named Asakaze :

 , a  launched in 1905 and scuttled in 1929
 , a  launched in 1922 and sunk in 1944
 , a  launched in 1941 as USS Ellyson she was acquired by Japan in 1954 and served until 1970
 , a  commissioned in 1979 and stricken in 2008

Japanese Navy ship names
Imperial Japanese Navy ship names
Japan Maritime Self-Defense Force ship names